Mogotes is a town and municipality in the Santander Department, in northeastern Colombia.

References

Municipalities of Santander Department